Ben Garth Mann (November 16, 1915 – September 11, 1980) was an American professional baseball pitcher who appeared as a pinch runner for the Chicago Cubs of Major League Baseball (MLB) in 1944. His one MLB appearance was on May 14, 1944, in the second game of a double-header against the Brooklyn Dodgers, when he ran for Lou Novikoff and scored a run on a single by Andy Pafko. Six days later he was optioned to the minors and never appeared in another Major League game.

References

References

1915 births
1980 deaths
Major League Baseball pitchers
Chicago Cubs players
Baseball players from Texas
People from Hill County, Texas
Nashville Vols players
Rayne Rice Birds players
Pensacola Pilots players
Dallas Rebels players
Montgomery Rebels players
Knoxville Smokies players
Oakland Oaks (baseball) players
Seattle Rainiers players
Sacramento Solons players
Shreveport Sports players
Dallas Eagles players